Kim Tai-chung (June 5, 1957 – August 27, 2011), also known as Kim Tai-jong or Tong Lung (唐龍; Chinese stage name), was a South Korean martial artist, actor and businessman known as taekwondo practitioner. Kim was one of two stand-ins for Bruce Lee used to complete Game of Death after Lee died during filming. Kim also played the ghost of Bruce Lee in No Retreat, No Surrender.

History and early career

Acting
In the 1970s, Kim made his first Hong Kong movie debut in 1977 film Snuff Bottle Connection, along with Hwang Jang-lee and Roy Horan. Kim played Bruce Lee's character Billy Lo in 1978 film Game of Death, alongside Yuen Biao (who performed the acrobatics and stunts), Kim played Lee's character so well that the producers used him again a few years later.

In the 1980s, Kim played Bobby Lo in 1981 film Game of Death II alongside Hwang Jang-lee, Roy Horan, To Wai-wo and Lee Hoi-san. After Game of Death II, Kim returned to Korea and made his one and only local Korean film Miss, Please Be Patient (아가씨 참으세요) along with the former Korean beauty romance film star Jeong Yun-hui. However the film was a commercial failure despite its praise from the film critiques.

Then he joined the Korean and Taiwanese co-production film to play the role of Bruce Lee once again in 1982 film Jackie vs. Bruce to the Rescue (also known as Fist of Death) along with Lee Siu-ming (A Taiwanese Stuntman and Jackie Chan look alike.), which was a commercial and critical failure. Soon he took a break from acting after the release of this film.

In June 1985, Chinese film producer Ng See-yuen was looking for an actor to play the ghost of Bruce Lee in 1986 film No Retreat, No Surrender in his American debut and final film, which marked the film debut of Belgian martial artist actor Jean-Claude Van Damme as Ivan Kraschinsky. Kim played Bruce Lee to training Kurt McKinney's martial artist.

Retired from acting
After No Retreat, No Surrender, Kim returned to Korea and retired from acting at the age of 29 and became a businessman.

In 2008, Kim made a rare public appearance in Korea as part of a screening of Miss, Please Be Patient (아가씨 참으세요), which had originally been released in 1981. Kim had played a leading role in that film.

Death
On August 27, 2011, Kim died of stomach hemorrhage at the age of 54.

Filmography

Movies
 Snuff Bottle Connection (1977)
 Game of Death (1978)
 Game of Death II (1981)
 Miss, Please Be Patient (1981)
 Jackie and Bruce to the Rescue (1982)
 No Retreat, No Surrender (1986)

Documentary
 Bruce Lee, the Man and the Legend (1984)

References

External links
 

South Korean male film actors
South Korean businesspeople
South Korean male taekwondo practitioners
1957 births
2011 deaths
Bruce Lee imitators
Deaths from gastrointestinal hemorrhage